Homer William Hall (July 22, 1870 – September 22, 1954) was a U.S. Representative from Illinois.

Born in Shelbyville, Illinois, Hall moved with his parents to Bloomington, Illinois, in 1876.
He attended the public schools and Illinois Wesleyan University at Bloomington.
He studied law.
He was admitted to the bar in 1892 and commenced practice in Bloomington, Illinois.
He engaged in banking and was also interested in agricultural pursuits.
He was a county judge of McLean County 1909-1914, probate judge 1909-1914, and master in chancery 1916-1918.  He served as delegate to the Republican National Convention in 1916.

Hall was elected as a Republican to the Seventieth, Seventy-first, and Seventy-second Congresses (March 4, 1927 – March 3, 1933).
He was an unsuccessful candidate for reelection in 1932 to the Seventy-third Congress.  He resumed the practice of law and agricultural pursuits.

Hall was again elected as county judge of McLean County, in 1934, and served until his retirement in 1942.
He died in Bloomington, Illinois, September 22, 1954.
He was interred in Park Hill Cemetery.

References

1870 births
1954 deaths
Illinois Wesleyan University alumni
Probate court judges in the United States
Illinois state court judges
Republican Party members of the United States House of Representatives from Illinois
People from Shelbyville, Illinois
People from Bloomington, Illinois